Mount Khakandya is a peak in the Suntar-Khayata Range, East Siberian System, Russia.

Administratively it is located in the Khabarovsk Krai of the Russian Far East.

See also
List of mountains and hills of Russia
List of ultras of Northeast Asia

References

Mountains of Khabarovsk Krai
Suntar-Khayata